BeeSat-1 or Berlin Experimental and Educational Satellite 1, is a German satellite operated by the Technical University of Berlin. The spacecraft is a single unit CubeSat, which was designed to test systems intended for use on future spacecraft, including a new design of reaction wheel. It has also been used for amateur radio, and is equipped with a small camera.

BeeSat-1 was launched by a Polar Satellite Launch Vehicle, serial number C14, flying in the Core Alone, or PSLV-CA, configuration. The launch took place from the First Launch Pad at the Satish Dhawan Space Centre, at 06:21 UTC on 23 September 2009. BeeSat-1 was a secondary payload aboard the rocket, which deployed the Oceansat-2 satellite. Five other secondary payloads were flown aboard the rocket; SwissCube-1, UWE-2, ITU-pSat1, Rubin 9.1 and Rubin 9.2.

It has an orbital period of 99.16 minutes. BeeSat-1 was designed to operate for at least twelve months, and  it is still operational.

See also

 2009 in spaceflight
 List of CubeSats

References

Spacecraft launched in 2009
CubeSats
Student satellites
Satellites of Germany